On September 26, 1999, a stockpile of illegally stored fireworks and gunpowder exploded in the Mexican city of Celaya, killing 63 people and wounding 348 others.

The disaster was caused by the detonation of four tons of fireworks and gunpowder at about 10:30 local time, which triggered several more explosions of either fireworks or nearby gas cylinders.  52 people were initially killed in the explosions, with eleven more later dying in hospitals.  348 people were injured and hospitalized.

Following the explosions, Mexican President Ernesto Zedillo announced that the government would conduct an investigation into the disaster.  Authorities later arrested five business inspectors accused of illegally issuing permits, an agent of the attorney general's office accused of abuse of authority by failing to report the illegal trade, and seven business owners accused of illegally possessing and selling fireworks.  Charges of being accessories to homicide were also brought against the inspectors and one of the business owners

References

1999 in Mexico
Explosions in 1999
September 1999 events in Mexico
Explosions in Mexico
Industrial fires and explosions in Mexico
Fireworks accidents and incidents
Illegal fireworks operations
1999 disasters in Mexico